The Daleks' Master Plan is the mostly missing fourth serial of the third season in the British science fiction television series Doctor Who, which originally aired in twelve weekly parts from 13 November 1965 to 29 January 1966. This twelve-part serial is the longest with a single director and production code. (The Trial of a Time Lord was longer but was made in three production blocks, with separate codes, and with four separate story lines each with their own authors and working titles)

This serial marks the final appearance of Adrienne Hill as companion Katarina, and the only appearance of Jean Marsh as Sara Kingdom. Katarina and Sara Kingdom both die during the serial, marking the first two companion deaths in the show. Episode 1, "The Nightmare Begins", marks the first appearance of Nicholas Courtney in Doctor Who, here playing space security agent Bret Vyon.

It was the second Doctor Who story never to be screened in Australia; the Australian Broadcasting Corporation judged the story to be unsuitable for children. Only three of the twelve episodes (two, five and ten) are held in the BBC archives; nine remain missing.

Plot

Some six months after the events of "Mission to the Unknown", the TARDIS arrives on the planet Kembel, and the First Doctor leaves the TARDIS to try to find medical aid for the wounded Steven, leaving him with the Trojan servant girl Katarina. Meanwhile, a Space Agent, Bret Vyon is also on the planet trying to find out what happened to Agent Marc Cory. After a less-than-amicable meeting with the TARDIS travellers in which he holds them at gunpoint and demands to be taken away from the planet, Vyon helps cure Steven and agrees to work with them to escape and warn Earth of the massive Dalek-led alliance that is amassing on the planet. Part of this alliance is the treacherous Guardian of The Solar System, Mavic Chen, who has brought a sample of the extremely rare Taranium, which will become a key part of the Daleks' ultimate weapon, the Time Destructor. The Daleks soon learn of their presence on the planet and the Dalek Supreme gives the command for Operation Inferno to be carried out, burning down the jungle. The travelers shelter at the Dalek city. The Doctor manages to steal the Taranium by impersonating delegate Zephon, and he, his companions and Bret escape on Chen's ship, termed a Spar.

The Daleks exterminate Zephon for allowing the Doctor to impersonate him and they then cause the Spar to crash on Desperus, a penal planet where prisoners are left to fend for themselves. Mavic Chen departs for Earth in a temporary ship, wanting to find out exactly who the people who stole the Taranium are. On Desperus, the Doctor repairs the ship, and they escape when the pursuing Dalek ship itself crashes upon arrival. However, a convict named Kirksen sneaks aboard the Spar prior to take-off and holds Katarina hostage in the airlock once the ship has left Desperus. He demands to be taken to Kembel or else he will kill Katarina, but she sacrifices herself by opening the airlock, forcing them out into space. The Daleks warn Chen that the fugitives will be heading for Earth to inform them of their presence on Kembel, and order him to kill them on sight and snatch the Taranium core. Chen worries that that would make the Space Security Service realise he is a traitor, so he instead tells everyone on Earth that the Taranium core is actually a vital substance needed to keep the peace. Space Security Agents patrol all corridors and guard all offices, and all landing bays are monitored for the arrival of Chen's Spar.

After mourning Katarina's loss, the party arrives on Earth and meets a contact of Vyon's, who is in league with Chen. Bret kills him but seconds later another Space Agent, Sara Kingdom arrives and kills Vyon (who it later transpires is actually her brother) and attempts to get the Taranium from the Doctor and Steven, but they escape. She pursues them to a laboratory, where they are caught in the middle of a molecular dissemination experiment and are inadvertently transported to Mira, a planet populated by savage invisible creatures, where the three enter into an uneasy alliance. They are constantly attacked by the creatures, the Visians, and try to take shelter.

On Earth, Mavic Chen is distraught, believing that the Taranium was destroyed during transportation. However, the scientists carrying out the Dissemination inform him that the computers are registering that the matter that has been transported (a cage of mice) has successfully arrived on Mira. Chen angrily says that this is no evidence that the taranium wasn't broken up into pieces. He believes he will be exterminated by the Daleks for his failure, so when he makes his report to them, he says he lured the fugitives into the laboratory, as their presence on Earth would have caused suspicions of the Dalek plan, and tells them to pick up the Taranium from Mira whilst he returns to Kembel. When the Daleks arrive they are attacked by the invisible creatures, and the Doctor, Steven and Sara commandeer the Dalek ship and escape. It turns out that the Daleks can pilot the ship remotely and bring it back to Kembel, but the Doctor is able to create a fake Taranium core, which they hand over to the Daleks before escaping Kembel in the TARDIS.

After a brief interlude in which the Doctor and his companions journey to a police station in 1960s England and then a silent film set in America, the trio toast Christmas, and the Doctor breaks the fourth wall by wishing a happy Christmas to the viewers at home.

On Kembel, the Daleks test the Time Destructor on delegate Trantis. It has no effect, and the Daleks realise it is a fake. A taskforce of Daleks disembarks to chase the travellers, intending on recapturing the real core. Meanwhile, The TARDIS arrives on a volcanic planet where the Doctor has a run-in with his old enemy, the Meddling Monk, who attempts to sabotage the TARDIS in revenge for the Doctor previously stranding him in 11th century England. The Doctor is still able to fly the TARDIS to Ancient Egypt, though he has to stop there for repairs. The Monk follows him, as does the Daleks and Mavic Chen. The Monk, Sara and Steven are captured and used as hostages, and without time to create another fake, the Doctor is forced to hand over the real Taranium core. They escape when some Ancient Egyptians attack the Daleks which they describe as 'war machines'. Knowing that the Daleks will now carry out their invasion, the Doctor steals the directional control from the Monk's TARDIS, so that they can return to Kembel and stop the Daleks. The Monk unwittingly ends up on a desolate, icy planet, and realises he can no longer control the destination of his TARDIS.

The Doctor returns the TARDIS to Kembel, where Steven and Sara (who get briefly separated from the Doctor) discover that the Daleks have turned on their allies, including Chen, and imprisoned them before apparently leaving the planet. The two TARDIS travellers free the alien leaders, and they leave to persuade their governments to ally against the Daleks, though Chen appears to die when his Spar explodes during take-off. Steven and Sara then find an underground base being used by the Daleks, only to be captured and held at gunpoint by a delusional Chen, who marches them into the base and the Dalek control room. He tries to proclaim himself the leader of the Daleks, but they dismissively kill him.

Now reunited with his companions, the Doctor activates the fully assembled Time Destructor. Knowing that the device will quickly begin ageing anything in its vicinity, the Daleks allow the Doctor to escape with Steven and Sara. Steven goes ahead back to the TARDIS, but Sara insists on accompanying the Doctor. The two are unable to get back to the TARDIS before the Time Destructor reaches full power, and Sara is aged to death and reduced to dust metres away from the TARDIS. Steven helps the Doctor back inside and, freed from the Destructor's influence, the two are left weakened, but alive and back to their original ages. The Daleks try to destroy the Time Destructor, but instead cause it to run out of control, resulting in it destroying the Daleks and all life on the planet. The Doctor and Steven emerge from the TARDIS, and Steven is distraught over the deaths of Bret, Katarina and Sara, while the Doctor can only contemplate the "terrible waste" that has taken place.

Production

 Episode is missing

Script
According to the credits, the serial was written by Terry Nation (episodes 1–5 & 7) and Dennis Spooner (episodes 6 & 8–12), with the credit "From an idea by Terry Nation" on Spooner's episodes. Script editor Donald Tosh claimed in an interview that the work done by Nation on the serial amounted to less than 20 pages of work, and that he wrote most of Nation's episodes. However, Doctor Who historian David Brunt has disputed this, saying that Nation submitted over 30 pages of script for each of his episodes (apart from "The Feast of Steven") and that Tosh only polished the dialogue and/or cut scenes out for time or budget reasons.

Another controversy involves the title of the serial. Perhaps because of the multiple authors and/or typists, virtually every conceivable variant of the title The Daleks' Master Plan was used in contemporary documents, though this version is on a plurality of camera scripts. During production the story was referred to as Twelve Part Dalek Story on some documents.

The original intention was that the police station scenes of the Christmas episode would feature a crossover with the characters and location of the BBC's popular police drama Z-Cars. However, the Z-Cars production team vetoed the idea, although the Liverpool-area location of the police station survived in the transmitted episode. John Peel's novelisation of the serial references this plan by using the cast names of the Z-Cars actors for the police characters' names.

According to the liner notes for the CD release the fictional mineral taranium was originally called "vitaranium", but was shortened during production because of concerns about William Hartnell's ability to pronounce it. Also, it was felt that "vitaranium" sounded too much like "vitamin".

Christmas episode
Tosh and producer John Wiles later claimed that the scene where the Doctor and his companions celebrate Christmas was not originally in the script, and that either the scene was hastily written by director Douglas Camfield when the episode ran short or that Hartnell made an unscripted ad lib. However, it appears on Camfield's camera script, and it was common practice at the time for BBC shows to have a direct address to camera for a Christmas episode; editing would have allowed for the removal of the line if necessary.

Cast notes
Jean Marsh had previously played Princess Joanna in The Crusade (and later played Morgaine in Battlefield). She had also been married to future Third Doctor actor Jon Pertwee.

Kevin Stoney returned as Tobias Vaughn, another villain working with an alien force – the Cybermen — against the Earth, in the Second Doctor serial The Invasion (1968). Additionally, Stoney also played Tyrum in the Fourth Doctor serial Revenge of the Cybermen (1975).

The lead actress of the film seen in "The Feast of Steven" was played by Sheila Dunn, who was Douglas Camfield's fiancée at the time the episode was in production. The two married just before the serial completed production. Camfield later cast her in a minor voice role in The Invasion and a major screen role in Inferno.

The alien delegates at the Daleks' conference on Kembel differ from those seen in "Mission to the Unknown", and as that episode is lost, there is some confusion over which is which. Those that reappear here had all been recast (see Ronald Rich), while some are new to Master Plan and some seen in "Mission" are missing – this only came to light when "Day of Armageddon" was returned to the BBC archives.

Reg Pritchard, who appears in "The Feast of Steven" as "Man in Mackintosh" had previously played Ben Daheer in The Crusade (1965), and the Doctor seemingly mistakes him for this character. Brian Cant later played Chairman Tensa in The Dominators (1968). Royston Tickner later played Robbins in The Sea Devils (1972).

Nicholas Courtney returned in the 1967 serial The Web of Fear as series regular Brigadier Lethbridge-Stewart, and then went on to appear regularly as the Brigadier over the years until theThe Sarah Jane Adventures episode, Enemy of the Bane.

Missing episodes

Currently, only episodes 2, 5, and 10 are known as extant. All 12 episodes were recorded on and transmitted from videotape. Subsequently, BBC Enterprises had 16mm film telerecordings made for potential overseas sales. However, Episode 7 ("The Feast of Steven"), the Christmas episode, was excluded from this and the story offered for sale was an 11-part version. The original videotapes of Episodes 1, 2, 4, 5, 7, 8 and 9 are listed among the first Doctor Who episodes ever ordered to be wiped, on 17 August 1967. At this point, "The Feast of Steven" became the first episode of Doctor Who to be seemingly lost forever. Episodes 3, 6, 10, 11 & 12 were wiped on 31 January 1969.

BBC Enterprises retained their film copies, although the story was never purchased by any overseas broadcasters, until at least 1972. A set of viewing prints was sent to the Australian Broadcasting Corporation, but the story was declined (as it was judged to be A (suitable for adults) on the basis of its overall storyline, rather than cuttable scenes) and the fate of these prints is unknown. At some point in the next four years, the BBC's film copies were junked.

A film copy of Episode 4 ("The Traitors") wound up in the BBC Film Library, although the reasons for this are unclear, as that library had no formal mandate to retain such material. In 1973, the episode was loaned to the Blue Peter production office for a feature on Doctor Who and never returned. Its ultimate fate remains unknown. By 1976, the entire story was considered to be lost. However, Episodes 5 ("Counter Plot") and 10 ("Escape Switch") were returned in 1983 from the basement of a Latter-day Saint church. The circumstances of how they got there remain unclear. Episode 2 ("Day of Armageddon") was returned to the BBC in early 2004 by Francis Watson, a former BBC engineer. Given that this is one of only two Hartnell stories that were never screened outside of the UK (the other being "Mission to the Unknown"), the recovery of the missing episodes from overseas sources remains unlikely.

Various clips from Episodes 1, 3, and 4 also survive:
 Episode 1 ("The Nightmare Begins") – In late 1991, a mute copy of the pre-filmed inserts for the story was discovered in a film can in the BBC archive. In 1998, these inserts were combined with the off-air soundtracks. A colourised version of this footage, made by Stuart Humphryes (AKA YouTube's Babelcolour) and James Russell was included as part of "The Dalek Tapes", a featurette on the Genesis of the Daleks DVD.
 Episode 3 ("Devil's Planet") – A clip of around 90 seconds was screened in a 1971 edition of Blue Peter (then co-presented by Peter Purves, who played the Doctor's companion Steven Taylor). Purves, in introducing the clip, erroneously identifies the serial by the title Devil's Planet, when it was only this individual episode.
 Episode 4 ("The Traitors") – A 1973 edition of Blue Peter featured another item on Doctor Who and included a clip of the scene leading up to Katarina's ejection from the airlock.
 In addition, prior to the recovery of the episode itself, the prefilmed inserts for Episode 2 ("Day of Armageddon"), including the raw soundtrack, were retained by the BBC Film Library and never junked. In 1991, the archive copy was discovered to be missing, but it was recovered in 1993. In 1998, these inserts were combined with the off-air soundtracks to reproduce the scenes as transmitted.

"The Feast of Steven" is the only episode to have existing home photographs, captured by Robert Jewell, who played Bing Crosby in the episode. The only surviving photographs that exist for the other missing episodes are production stills. Since there are so few of them for the individual episodes, clips and screenshots from the surviving episodes - mainly focusing on the Daleks - are often used in fan-made reconstructions.

On stage
The serial was adapted as a charity stage production in October 2007 by Interalia Theatre in Portsmouth, UK, as a finale to their highly successful run of previous Doctor Who stage shows. It was adapted and directed by Nick Scovell and produced by Rob Thrush. Scovell starred as the Doctor, as in the company's previous productions. Nicholas Briggs guest starred as the voice of the Daleks and also, briefly, as the Doctor following a regeneration scene at the play's end.

Commercial releases

In print

The Australian Doctor Who fanzine Zerinza had published a novelisation of the story in 1980, as issue #14/15/16 (thereafter reprinted a few times), but was not novelised by Target Books for almost ten more years, when it finally appeared in two volumes. The first, Mission to the Unknown, consisted of an adaptation of "Mission to the Unknown" and Episodes 1–6 of Master Plan. The second, The Mutation of Time, adapted Episodes 7–12. Both were written by John Peel at the request of Terry Nation and were published in September and October 1989, respectively.

Peel had intended to write the novelisation as a single, long book, but at the time Target Books had a page-limit maximum that required splitting the manuscript into two parts.

Peel made one major change to the televised storyline by placing a six-month gap between the first and second volumes; he later stated that this was to enable future writers to develop original storylines involving the character of Sara Kingdom. Other minor changes include a brief resolution to events in Ancient Egypt and forty-first century Earth.

In May 2010 unabridged readings of both volumes by Peter Purves and Jean Marsh, with Dalek voices supplied by Nicholas Briggs, were released by BBC Audiobooks. The titles were slightly modified to Daleks – Mission to the Unknown and Daleks – The Mutation of Time.

Home media
Episodes 5 and 10 were released on VHS on the tape Daleks – The Early Years in July 1992, which also included the silent pre-filmed inserts, which had been then-recently recovered (see above). In November 2004, all three surviving episodes were released on Region 2 DVD, in the three-disc Lost in Time box set, along with all extant clips from the story.

Soundtracks of all the episodes survive due to several fans recording the original transmissions. In 2001, the entire story (together with Mission to the Unknown) was released on CD with additional narration by Peter Purves, combining the best quality sections from various fan recordings and surviving master copies of the original music and sound effects. On 15 February 2019, in a new range called "Vinyl Who", the BBC released this story through Demon Music Group (again alongside Mission to the Unknown and with Peter Purves's narration) as a 7 x Heavyweight LP vinyl in both translucent blue and "Splatter Vinyl" editions. In January 2019, it was announced that another collection of high quality audio recordings, dubbed "The Randolph Tapes", had been discovered.

The music from this serial was released as part of Doctor Who: Devils' Planets – The Music of Tristram Cary in 2003.

References

External links

First Doctor serials
Dalek television stories
Doctor Who missing episodes
Doctor Who stories set on Earth
British Christmas television episodes
Television episodes written by Terry Nation
Doctor Who Christmas specials
Television episodes set in ancient Egypt
Fiction set in the 3rd millennium BC
Fiction set in 1921
Fiction set in 1965
Fiction set in the 4th millennium